Catholic University of Uruguay  (in Spanish: Universidad Católica del Uruguay, acronym UCU) is a private university in Uruguay opened in 1985 (from various previous Catholic teaching institutions). It was the only private university in the country for 11 years until 1996. Its full name is Universidad Católica del Uruguay Dámaso Antonio Larrañaga, after Dámaso Antonio Larrañaga, and is a work of the Society of Jesus.

Its main campus is spread out in six locations in Montevideo; there are two other campuses, in Maldonado and Salto.

History

The university was founded by the Archbishop of Montevideo, Monseigneur Mariano Soler, in 1882. In 1985, it was reopened and entrusted to the Society of Jesus. The university seeks to promote a combination of academic excellence, ideological pluralism, ecumenism, and inter-religious dialogue.

From its beginning, the Catholic University of Uruguay gave itself the challenge of being a different option in university teaching. It took to working in areas that had been neglected, and to playing a role as an innovator in the development of new educational methods and evangelization of culture. It is now one of the most prestigious centers of university learning in Uruguay.

In 2017 it was ranked as the top university in Uruguay and 1,322 in the world. It offers studies abroad and student exchange programs.

Programs 
In 2015 the university partnered with Orkestra-Basque Institute of Competitiveness to address the issue of competition between companies. Also, in conjunction with a professor at Pennsylvania State University, researchers at UCU study the effects of iron deficiency and lead toxicity on behavioral and cognitive development in children. In 2016 the university signed an agreement of cooperation with the newly founded University of Tifariti.

Sponsored sports activities include futsal (male and female), volleyball, basketball, women's handball, swimming, football, and hockey. The university offers students workshops to develop their artistic abilities in chorus, theater, and visual arts.

Service projects are carried on for credit as integral or supplemental to classwork, as well as through voluntary projects without academic credit. In 2015 Extension Services at UCU counted 141 projects with 191 teachers and 1,700 students involved. A major vacation-time project is building homes for the poor,

There are student-organized events and tournaments throughout the year, and a series of workshops voted for by the students to foster their special interests. There is also a club which raises environmental awareness by collecting all plastic bottles on campus.

Departments

The university is divided into seven departments: Business Sciences, 
Nursing and Health Technologies, Human Sciences, Law, Engineering & Technology, Dentistry and Psychology.

Majors

Notable people

Faculty

Alumni

Gallery

See also
 List of Jesuit sites

References

External links
 Web site

 
Universities in Uruguay
Education in Montevideo
Jesuit universities and colleges
Catholic universities and colleges in Uruguay
Educational institutions established in 1985
1985 establishments in Uruguay